Wendy Williams (born 1964) is an American radio and television personality.

Wendy Williams may also refer to:

People
Wendy Williams (British actress) (1934–2019)
Wendy Williams (cricketer) (1942–2012), Welsh cricketer
Wendy Williams (diver) (born 1967), American Olympic diver
Wendy M. Williams (born 1960), psychologist and professor
Wendy O. Williams (1949–1998), U.S. singer
Wendy Berger (born Wendy Leigh Williams in 1968), American judge

Other uses
 Wendy Williams: The Movie, a 2021 U.S. made-for-TV biopic
 The Wendy Williams Show, a U.S. talk show
 Wendy Williams (Home and Away), a character from the Australian soap opera Home and Away

See also

 The Wendy Williams Experience, a 2006 U.S. reality TV show
 
 Williams (disambiguation)
 Wendy (disambiguation)